The US Coast Guard and Geodetic Survey Seismological and Geomagnetic House, also known as the Forest Service House, is a historic house at 210 Seward Street in Sitka, Alaska.  It is a two-story wood-frame structure, resting on a concrete foundation, with a gambrel roof.  The house was built in 1916 by the United States Department of Commerce to house employees of the U.S. National Geodetic Survey working at the Sitka Geomagnetic Observatory.  In 1929 modifications were made in its basement to house seismological instruments here, instead of in the observatory buildings to the north.  The observatory was moved in 1940 to a new site further northwest; this house was acquired by the United States Forest Service, which has used it in a variety of ways, including office space and housing, since then.

The house was listed on the National Register of Historic Places in 1986.

See also
National Register of Historic Places listings in Sitka City and Borough, Alaska

References

Houses on the National Register of Historic Places in Alaska
Houses completed in 1916
Houses in Sitka, Alaska
Buildings and structures on the National Register of Historic Places in Sitka, Alaska